Vel River is the name of several rivers:

 Vel or Velyu, a tributary of the Pechora in Komi Republic, Russia
 Vel (Vaga), a tributary of the Vaga in Arkhangelsk Oblast, Russia
 Vel River (Bhima) (Wel River), a tributary of the Bhima River in Pune District, Maharashtra, India

ru:Вель (река)